Howard Hughes (1905–1976) was an American aviator, movie producer, and industrialist

Howard Hughes may also refer to:

 Howard R. Hughes, Sr. (1869–1924), industrialist and inventor and father of Howard Hughes (1905–1976)
 Howard Hughes (murderer) (born 1965), British paedophile and murderer
 Howard Hughes, British broadcaster, disk-jockey and voice-over artist for The Moment of Truth, and Simply the Best
 Howard Hughes Engineering, an Australian company